The name Irah has been used for three tropical cyclones in the Eastern Pacific Ocean:

 Tropical Storm Irah (1963)
 Tropical Storm Irah (1969)
 Hurricane Irah (1973)

Pacific hurricane set index articles